Sultan Abdul Jalil I (1562–1571) was the Sultan of Johor from 1570 to 1571.  He was succeeded as sultan by his father Ali Jalla Abdul Jalil Shah II.

Abdul Jalil I was the nephew of his predecessor Muzaffar II of Johor.  He died after ruling only one year, according to some due to poisoning.

Sources

1562 births
1571 deaths
Sultans of Johor
16th-century monarchs in Asia
Child monarchs from Asia
16th-century murdered monarchs
Deaths by poisoning
Monarchs who died as children
Murder in 1571